Parliamentary elections were held in Bolivia on 1 May 1928 to elect members of the National Congress.

Results

References

Elections in Bolivia
Bolivia
Legislative election
Election and referendum articles with incomplete results